Lynette ("Lyn") Coleman (born 16 September 1964) is an Australian Paralympic boccia player, athlete and swimmer with cerebral palsy.

Career 
Lyn was born in Brisbane. At the 1984 New York/Stoke Mandeville Paralympics, she won a silver medal in the Women's Slalom C1 event and also competed in swimming . At the 1988 Seoul Paralympics, she competed in athletics and boccia events, and she competed solely in boccia at the 1992 Barcelona, 1996 Atlanta, and 2000 Sydney Paralympics. From 1995 to 2000, her international ranking climbed every year. In 2000, she received an Australian Sports Medal.

In July 2005, she won the BC3 singles and BC3 pairs (with Laura Solomon) and in September of that year, she reached the quarter finals of the BC3 Singles event and was part of the team that came fourth in the BC3 Teams event in the Asia and South Pacific Boccia Championships.

References 

Paralympic athletes of Australia
Paralympic boccia players of Australia
Athletes (track and field) at the 1984 Summer Paralympics
Swimmers at the 1984 Summer Paralympics
Athletes (track and field) at the 1988 Summer Paralympics
Boccia players at the 1988 Summer Paralympics
Boccia players at the 1992 Summer Paralympics
Boccia players at the 1996 Summer Paralympics
Boccia players at the 2000 Summer Paralympics
Medalists at the 1984 Summer Paralympics
Paralympic silver medalists for Australia
Paralympic medalists in athletics (track and field)
Cerebral Palsy category Paralympic competitors
Sportspeople with cerebral palsy
Sportswomen from Queensland
Sportspeople from Brisbane
Recipients of the Australian Sports Medal
1964 births
Living people
Athletes from Brisbane